Agnew's Village (or Agnew) was a small unincorporated village in what is now Santa Clara, California. It was named for Abram Agnew, a Santa Clara Valley pioneer from Ohio who settled there around 1873. Agnew donated  of land for a South Pacific Coast Railroad station and laid out the town, causing the station and town to be referred to as "Agnew's". The railroad depot is still standing.

Agnew's land appears on 1877 maps, opposite Lick Mill, a paper mill operated by James Lick.  Agnew's Village was annexed into Santa Clara in the mid 1980s.

The Agnew name lives on in Agnew Park in Santa Clara, as well as Agnews Developmental Center, the western campus of which was located in Agnew's Village. The campus has since been turned into the Rivermark community and an R&D campus for Oracle Corporation (formerly the headquarters for Sun Microsystems).  The latter includes the  Agnews Historic Park.

Notable people
 Marv Owen (1906–1991) was a baseball player, manager, coach and scout. Known for his time on the Detroit Tigers.
 Edward J. Livernash, (1866–1938), was a newspaperman and lawyer who served one term as a U.S. Representative from California.

References

External links
 

Former settlements in Santa Clara County, California
Silicon Valley